Nika Kvantaliani (born 6 February 1998) is a Georgian football player who plays for FC Shukura Kobuleti.

Club career
He made his Ekstraklasa debut for Bruk-Bet Termalica Nieciecza on 19 February 2018 in a game against Górnik Zabrze. On 15 April 2019, he joined FC Shukura Kobuleti.

References

External links
 

1998 births
Living people
Footballers from Georgia (country)
Georgia (country) youth international footballers
FC Dinamo Batumi players
Bruk-Bet Termalica Nieciecza players
Widzew Łódź players
FC Shukura Kobuleti players
Ekstraklasa players
Expatriate footballers from Georgia (country)
Expatriate sportspeople from Georgia (country) in Spain
Expatriate footballers in Spain
Expatriate footballers in Poland
Association football midfielders